X-Cerpts: Live at Willisau is the second album led by trumpeter Herb Robertson which was recorded and released in 1987 on the JMT label.

Reception
AllMusic awarded the album 3 stars.

Track listing
All compositions by Herb Robertson
 "Jiffy Jester Jig (Part 1, 2 & 3) Lulla" - 27:28
 "Karmic Ramifications: Vibration/Formation/Dissipation/Transformation" - 31:28	
 "Flocculus" - 8:24

Personnel
Herb Robertson - trumpet, flugelhorn, pocket trumpet, cornet
Tim Berne - alto saxophone
Gust William Tsilis - vibraphone
Lindsay Horner - bass
Joey Baron - drums

References 

1987 live albums
Herb Robertson albums
JMT Records live albums
Live jazz albums